The following is a list of films produced in the Tamil film industry in India in 1946, in alphabetical order.

1946

References 

Tamil films
Lists of 1946 films by country or language
1946
1940s Tamil-language films